is a Japanese actress and a member of the Japanese idol group Idoling!!!. While the pronunciation is the same, her former professional name used to be written as 外岡 枝里香. She is a graduate of Hosei University.

Filmography

Movies 
 Abashiri Ikka The Movie (2009), as Kikunosuke Abashiri
 Re:Play-Girls (2010), as Michi
 Koneko no Kimochi (2011), as Myu

Dramas
 Tetsudou Musume (2008-2009)
 Asu no Hikari o Tsukame (2010), as Ayame Mizushima
 Marumo no Okite (2011), as Rinka Ozaki
 Asu no Hikari o Tsukame 2 (2011), as Ayame Mizushima
 Koi Nante Zeitaku ga Watashi ni Ochitekuru no darou ka? (2012) Fuji TV Two
 Kurohyo 2 Ryu ga Gotoku Asura-hen (2012) MBS, as Erika

TV shows 
 Idoling!!! (2006–2015) Fuji TV
 Ressha Sentai ToQger (2014), as Sakura Igawa (guest role)

Image video 
 Hajimari (May 2, 2008)
 Refreshing (September 30, 2008)
 Tono Tono Smile (February 18, 2009)
 Bathroom kara Ai o Komete (April 7, 2010)

TV commercials 
 ARAX Group (2006-2007) Chiba TV
 Agura Bokujo (2007-?)
 McDonald (2007-2009)
 SMBC Consumer Finance Promise (2012–?)
 Honda Cars (2014-?)

Bibliography

Photobooks 
 Himawari (November 22, 2007) 
 I am Seventeen (July 17, 2009)

References

External links 
  
 
 Official blog 
 

Japanese idols
21st-century Japanese actresses
1991 births
Living people
Idoling!!! members
People from Kanagawa Prefecture